Robert Hammerstiel (18 February 193323 November 2020) was an Austrian painter and engraver. His works are influenced by Serbian icon painting, wood-cut engraving and pop art. Hammerstiel was internationally recognized and received numerous awards. His home town installed a museum dedicated to his art.

Life and work 
Hammerstiel was born in Werschetz/Vršac, Kingdom of Yugoslavia, in a family of German expatriates. His father, Anton Hammerstiel, was a baker who also painted icons; his mother was Therese Hammerstiel, née Schiff. He attended German and Serbian primary schools. Towards the end of World War II, the Germans were expelled. Hammerstiel was deported to Zichydorf internment camp; his mother to a different camp. In 1947, he escaped with his mother and brother, first to Hungary where they lived from charity. They moved further to Austria. In Ternitz in Lower Austria, they lived in the village Pottschach, where Hammerstiel remained a resident for life. Hammerstiel became an apprentice to be a baker in 1949. When his father, who had been held as a prisoner of war, returned in 1950, he interested his son in painting and drawing, and also instructed him in icon painting. Robert Hammerstiel painted portraits and landscapes of the surroundings. He completed the baker's training in 1951 but from 1955 worked in the local steel industry. The following year, he married Margareta Speringer.

Hammerstiel took part in a competition of the Austrian Federation of Trade and won a prize, which resulted in studies of art. Parallel to his work, he began to study at the Wiener Kunstschule in 1959, first with Gerda Matjeka-Felden, and from 1963 to 1965 with Robert Schmitt, Gerhard Swoboda, August Swoboda and Hans Stockbauer. His topics, beginning in the 1960s, became faceless figures. He exhibited internationally from 1974. In 1985, he was awarded the honorary title Professor.

In 1988, he left his work in the steel industry and became a freelance artist. His works were exhibited in the Austrian Culture Institute in New York City, where he was exposed with American painting, and used radically bright colours for his compositions. He was the author of Von Ikonen und Ratten:  Eine Banater Kindheit 1939 – 1949 (with 32 woodcuts, Brandstaetter: Vienna, 1999); and illustrator of several books including Des Bischofs Kleid by Luisa Owens (2013). It shows stations of human life in simplified and brightly-coloured figures.

Hammerstiel was an honorary member of the Vojvodinian Academy of Sciences and Art. He died in Pottschach on 23 November 2020 at the age of 87.

His birth town dedicated a museum to his works in 2010. Andrea Mayer, Secretary of State in the Ministry of Culture of Austria, described his work as unique in the Austrian art scene, based on many regional traditions.

Exhibitions
Source homepage.
 1973 Landesmuseum Niederösterreich, Vienna
 1982 Vienna Künstlerhaus
 1988 Austrian Institute, New York City
 1991 Museum of Modern Art, Cairo
 1993 Vienna Künstlerhaus
 2002 National Museum, Vršac
 2006 Leopold Museum, Vienna
 2007 Vienna Künstlerhaus
 2008 Ständige Vertretung des Landes Baden-Württemberg at the EU, Brussels
 2009 Leopold Museum, Vienna

Works 
Source:

 Berlin, Germany House.
 Braunschweig, HAUM.
 Brugg, Gallery.
 New York.
 Cairo, Museum of Modern Art.
 Klosterneuburg / Lower Austria, Essl Collection.
 Madrid, Thyssen-Bornemisza Museum.
 New York, Austrian Culture Institute
 Novi Sad, Vojvodjanski muz.
 Recklinghausen, KH.
 Reutlingen, municipal KM donation house.
 Rome
 Vaticani Museum, Coll. d'Arte Relig. Mod.
 Centro Artist. Cult.
 Salzburg, MdM Rupertinum.
 Sofia, Municipal KG.
 St. Pölten, Lower Austria. LM.
 Tokyo, NM of Western Art.
 Vršac, H.-Mus.
 Vienna
 ABK.
 Albertina.
 City Department of Culture.
 Leopold Museum
 Austrian Gallery Belvedere.
 Federal collection.
 Rudolf Leopold Collection.
 Wiener Städtische Versicherung collection.

Awards 
 1973: Austrian State Prize for Graphics
 1998: Austrian Decoration for Science and Art
 2005: Knight of the Order of St. Sylvester (Pope John Paul II)
 2005: Golden Laurel of the Society of Artists in Austria, Vienna Künstlerhaus

References

External links 
 
 Robert Hammerstiel (Austrian, born 1933) artnet.com
 Exhibition / Robert F. Hammerstiel – Alles in bester Ordnung artfacts.net
 

20th-century Austrian painters
20th-century male artists
Austrian male painters
21st-century Austrian painters
21st-century male artists
Austrian printmakers
Serbian painters
Serbian printmakers
Banat Swabians
People of Hungarian German descent
Austrian people of Serbian descent
Serbian expatriates in Austria
People from Vršac
1933 births
2020 deaths
Recipients of the Austrian State Prize
Recipients of the Austrian Decoration for Science and Art
Knights of the Order of St. Sylvester
20th-century printmakers